On July 1, 2015, Boko Haram gunmen stormed the village of Kukawa, in Borno State and killed 97 people.  According to an anonymous senior government official, the militants targeted mosques, which they believed taught a form of Islam that was too moderate.  After killing dozens of people in the mosques, mainly men and boys, the gunmen then began to enter nearby houses and killed many of the inhabitants, including women and children.  The following day, July 2, 2015, gunmen killed 48 more people in two villages near Monguno in the same state.  At least 17 people were also injured in the attacks.

References

2015 murders in Nigeria
Terrorist incidents in Nigeria in 2015
Massacres perpetrated by Boko Haram
Mass murder in Borno State
Massacres in 2015
July 2015 events in Nigeria